The Eginsai Formation (Russian: Eginsai Svita) is a geological formation in Kazakhstan whose strata date back to the Late Cretaceous. Dinosaur remains are among the fossils that have been recovered from the formation.

Fossil content 
Among others, the following fossils have been reported from the formation:
 Asiahesperonis bazhanovi - "Vertebrae, tarsometatarsus, and tibiotarsus."
 Turgaiscapha kushmurunica

See also 
 List of dinosaur-bearing rock formations

References

Bibliography 
  

Geologic formations of Kazakhstan
Upper Cretaceous Series of Asia
Cretaceous Kazakhstan
Campanian Stage
Maastrichtian Stage
Siltstone formations
Sandstone formations
Phosphorite formations
Shallow marine deposits
Paleontology in Kazakhstan